The Golden Boot Awards were an American acknowledgement of achievement honoring actors, actresses, and crew members who made significant contributions to the genre of Westerns in television and film. The award was sponsored and presented by the Motion Picture & Television Fund. Money raised at the award banquet was used to help finance various services offered by the Fund to those in the entertainment industry.

Actor Pat Buttram conceived the idea of the Golden Boot Award, and they were presented annually from 1983 until being discontinued in 2007.

Honorees

1983, The 1st Annual Golden Boot Awards

 Rex Allen
 Dick Alexander
 Gene Autry
 Bruce Boxleitner
 Sunset Carson
 Eddie Dean
 Jack Elam
 Dale Evans
 Monte Hale
 Ben Johnson
 Lash LaRue
 Nat Levine
 Doug McClure
 Lee Majors
 Clayton Moore
 Slim Pickens
 Roy Rogers
 Charles Starrett
 Bob

 Steele
 Linda Stirling
 Forrest Tucker
 Lee Van Cleef
 Al Wyatt
 In Memoriam Award: Will Rogers

1984, The 2nd Annual Golden Boot Awards

 Robert Blake
 Red Buttons
 Pat Buttram
 Yakima Canutt
 John Carradine
 Iron Eyes Cody
 Chuck Connors
 Buddy Ebsen
 Jennifer Holt
 Michael Landon
 Sam Peckinpah
 Denver Pyle
 Ella Raines
 Jane Russell
 Peggy Stewart
 Dennis Weaver
 Marie Windsor
 In Memoriam Award: Buck Jones

1985, The 3rd Annual Golden Boot Awards

 Amanda Blake
 Ernest Borgnine
 Burt Kennedy
 Ricardo Montalbán
 Dale Robertson
 James Stewart
 Dub Taylor
 Robert J. Wilke
 Joe Yrigoyen
 Audie Murphy

1986, The 4th Annual Golden Boot Awards

 James Arness
 Carroll Baker
 Carl Cotner
 Burl Ives
 Louis L'Amour
 Fred MacMurray
 Guy Madison
 Jock Mahoney
 George Montgomery
 Fess Parker
 Glenn Randall
 Cesar Romero
 In Memoriam Award: Tex Ritter

1987, The 5th Annual Golden Boot Awards

 Gene Barry
 Harry Carey, Jr.
 André de Toth
 Richard Farnsworth
 Rhonda Fleming
 Glenn Ford
 Robert Livingston
 Joel McCrea
 Debra Paget
 John Russell
 Woody Strode
 In Memoriam Award: Tom Mix

1988, The 6th Annual Golden Boot Awards

 Gene Evans
 Stuart Hamblen
 Virginia Mayo
 Willie Nelson
 Ann Rutherford
 Fred Scott
 George Sherman
 Morgan Woodward
 In Memoriam Award: William S. Hart
 In Memoriam Award: Andy Devine

1989, The 7th Annual Golden Boot Awards

 Johnny Cash
 Ellen Corby
 Angie Dickinson
 Robert Duvall
 Robert Fuller
 John Ireland
 Dick Jones
 Paul Malvern
 Casey Tibbs

1990, The 8th Annual Golden Boot Awards

 Noah Beery, Jr.
 Budd Boetticher
 Sam Elliott
 George Kennedy
 Hal Needham
 Burt Reynolds
 Katharine Ross
 In Memoriam Award: Jay Silverheels

1991, The 9th Annual Golden Boot Awards

 John Agar
 Polly Burson
 Anthony Caruso
 Alice Faye
 Bob Hope
 Brian Keith
 Andrew V. McLaglen
 Hugh O'Brian
 Maureen O'Hara
 In Memoriam Award: Harry Carey

1992, The 10th Annual Golden Boot Awards

 Rand Brooks
 Arthur Gardner
 Richard Jaeckel
 Katy Jurado
 Arnold Laven
 Jules Levy
 Pierce Lyden
 A. C. Lyles
 Ann Miller
 Montie Montana
 Ronald Reagan
 Tom Selleck
 Alice Van Springsteen
 John Sturges
 Henry Wills
 Sheb Wooley
 In Memoriam Award: Tim Holt

1993, The 11th Annual Golden Boot Awards

 Chuck Courtney
 Clint Eastwood
 Jane Fonda
 Jack Palance
 Buck Taylor
 Ted Turner
 In Memoriam Award: William Boyd

1994, The 12th Annual Golden Boot Awards

 Paul Brinegar
 Bill Catching
 James Coburn
 Gail Davis
 Joanne Dru
 Walter Hill
 Robert Mitchum
 In Memoriam Award: Pat Buttram

1995, The 13th Annual Golden Boot Awards

 James Drury
 Andrew J. Fenady
 Bo Hopkins
 Bob Morgan
 Jane Seymour
 Claire Trevor
 In Memoriam Award: Burt Lancaster
 Founder's Award: Gene Autry

1996, The 14th Annual Golden Boot Awards

 Carroll Baker
 Lloyd Bridges
 Charles Bronson
 Bill Campbell
 Joe Canutt
 Herb Jeffries
 In Memoriam Award: John Wayne
 Founder's Award: Roy Rogers

1997, The 15th Annual Golden Boot Awards

 Leo Gordon
 Charles 'Chuck' Hayward
 Anne Jeffreys
 Karl Malden
 Robert Urich
 Clint Walker
 In Memoriam Award: Randolph Scott
 Founder's Award: John Ford

1998, The 16th Annual Golden Boot Awards

 Adrian Booth Brian
 David Carradine
 Keith Carradine
 Robert Carradine
 Frankie Laine
 John Mantley
 Founder's Award: Clayton Moore
 Harry Morgan
 Dean Smith
 In Memoriam Award: Barbara Stanwyck
 Patrick Wayne

1999, The 17th Annual Golden Boot Awards

 Julie Adams
 R. G. Armstrong
 David Dortort
 Kirk Douglas
 James Garner
 Jack Williams
 In Memoriam Award: DeForest Kelley
 Founder's Award: Mary Pickford Foundation and Charles 'Buddy' Rogers

2000, The 18th Annual Golden Boot Awards

 Tom Berenger
 Melissa Gilbert
 Donna Hall
 L. Q. Jones
 Howard Koch
 Robert Stack
 Founder's Award: Dale Evans
 Backbone of the B's Award: Gregg Barton
 Backbone of the B's Award: Myron Healey
 Backbone of the B's Award: Walter Reed
 Backbone of the B's Award: House Peters, Jr.

2001, The 19th Annual Golden Boot Awards

 Eli Wallach
 Barbara Hale
 Alex Cord
 Andrew Prine
 Loren Janes
 Chuck Norris
 Centennial Award: Clark Gable (presented to his son John Clark Gable)
 "Best of the West" Movie: Shanghai Noon

2002, The 20th Annual Golden Boot Awards

 Bruce Dern
 Peter Fonda
 David Huddleston
 Whitey Hughes
 Ruta Lee
 Stuart Whitman
 Ron Soble
 Peter Brown
 Will Hutchins
 Robert Colbert
 Roy Huggins
 William T. Orr
 William Witney
 Earl Bellamy
 Ted Post
 Donna Martell
 Marion Shilling
 Ruth Terry
 Gloria Winters
 Marsha Hunt
 Honorary Golden Boot: Colt's Manufacturing Company

2003, The 21st Annual Golden Boot Awards

 Tommy Lee Jones
 Chris Alcaide
 Graham Greene (actor)
 Tommy Farrell
 Terry Leonard
 Sue Ane Langdon
 Kris Kristofferson
 Michael Dante
 Kelo Henderson
 William Smith
 Charles Champlin
 Sons of the Pioneers
 "Best of the West" Movie: Tom Selleck for Monte Walsh

2004, The 22nd Annual Golden Boot Awards

 Val Kilmer
 Scott Glenn
 Randy Quaid
 Robert Horton
 Pat Hingle
 Rob Word
 In Memoriam Award: Johnny Mack Brown
 Gale Storm
 Noel Neill
 Lois Hall
 Elaine Riley
 Golden Voice of Radio Award: Fred Foy

2005, The 23rd Annual Golden Boot Awards

 James Caan
 Debbie Reynolds
 Wilford Brimley
 Martha Crawford Cantarini, Stuntwoman
 Mark Harmon
 Phil Spangenberger
 Ben Cooper
 Encore Westerns Channel
 Founder's Award: Jim Rogers
 Kids of the West:
 Gary Gray
 Mickey Kuhn
 Michael Chapin
 Eilene Janssen
 Johnny Crawford
 Lee Aaker

2006, The 24th Annual Golden Boot Awards

 Powers Boothe
 Ann-Margret
 Wes Studi
 Joan Leslie
 Leslie H. Martinson, Director
 Buddy Van Horn, Stunt Coordinator
 Special Tribute: George "Gabby" Hayes
 Founder's Award: Clint Eastwood

2007, The 25th Annual Golden Boot Awards

 Caruth C. Byrd
 Lee Horsley
 Martin Kove
 Walt LaRue, Stuntman
 Viggo Mortensen
 Eva Marie Saint
 Champion Award: Jackie Autry, wife of Gene Autry
 Founder's Award: John Wayne

References

External links
 Golden Boot Awards home page
The Golden Boot Awards at the Internet Movie Database
Clyde Lucas Musical Director for The Golden Boots Award Show
List of honorees from The Golden Boot Awards at B-Westerns.com

1983 establishments in the United States
2007 disestablishments in the United States
Acting awards
Awards established in 1983
Awards disestablished in 2007
American television awards
American film awards
Western (genre) films